Edwin Berkeley Portman (3 August 1830 – 27 April 1921) was an English barrister and Liberal politician.

Portman was born at Bryanston, Dorset, the son of Edward Portman, 1st Viscount Portman and his wife Lady Emma Lascelles. He was educated at Rugby School and Balliol College, Oxford. He was called to the bar at Inner Temple in 1852.

In 1885 Portman was elected Member of Parliament for North Dorset. He lost the seat in 1892.

References

External links 
 

1830 births
1921 deaths
People educated at Rugby School
Alumni of Balliol College, Oxford
Liberal Party (UK) MPs for English constituencies
UK MPs 1885–1886
UK MPs 1886–1892
Younger sons of viscounts